Charles Robson (20 June 1859 – 27 September 1943) was an English first-class cricketer, who played as a wicket-keeper for Middlesex between 1881 and 1883, and for Hampshire from 1891 to 1906, for whom he served as captain for three years from 1900 to 1902.

He was also secretary to Southampton Football Club for one season, from 1895 to 1896.

Cricket career
Robson was born at Kilburn, (then in Middlesex) and educated at Bruce Castle School, Tottenham and at Chatham House Grammar School, Ramsgate, and was a member of the cricket eleven at both schools.

Middlesex
He made his first appearance for Middlesex against Surrey in May 1881 when he opened the batting in the second innings, scoring 5 and 16*, helping Middlesex to victory by ten wickets. At Middlesex, he was played as a batsman rather than a wicket-keeper, with A J Webbe being the long-established 'keeper. His highest score for Middlesex came shortly after his debut, in the match against Oxford University in June, when he scored 57* in the second innings as Middlesex won by seven wickets.

Robson spent three seasons with Middlesex, during which he played twelve matches, totalling 246 runs at an average of 12.94.

Hampshire
In 1891, he made his first appearance for Hampshire, then not ranked as a first-class county. The June 1891 match lasted only two days with Essex winning by an innings and 40 runs, with Robson contributing 52 runs in his two innings. He soon became the wicket-keeper for Hampshire and was often the opening batsman in partnership with Russell Bencraft.

Robson continued to play for Hampshire after they were re-instated as a First Class county in 1896, and in 1899 was a member of K. S. Ranjitsinhji's side who toured the United States, playing twice against the Gentlemen of Philadelphia as well as three other matches.

He was appointed Hampshire's captain in 1900 (taking over from Teddy Wynyard), and marked this by scoring his only century in First Class cricket; this came at Edgbaston in June 1900 when he scored 101 in the second innings against Warwickshire; he shared in a stand of 180 with Edward Sprot for the second wicket in a drawn match.

In June 1901, Hampshire were facing almost certain defeat against Lancashire at Aigburth, Liverpool. Hampshire were bowled out in the first innings for only 106, and Lancashire replied with 413–8 declared. When Hampshire opened the second innings, few people thought that Lancashire would need to bat again. J. G. Greig opened the batting and the score had reached 374, with one wicket remaining and Hampshire still seemingly heading for defeat. Robson came to the wicket as the last batsman in and he and Greig put on an unlikely 113 for the tenth wicket (Robson 52); Greig's innings was 249*. Lancashire's eventual target was 181 in 140 minutes; they closed at 111 for 5, rain having cut short play by almost an hour.

He was a member of Archie MacLaren's touring party to Australia in 1901/02, playing in one match against Victoria in February 1902. For the 1902 season, he passed the Hampshire captaincy to Edward Sprot, but continued to serve Hampshire for a further five seasons, although by 1906 his appearances were rather infrequent. His final match for Hampshire came at Basingstoke in May 1906 against Warwickshire.

Southampton St Mary's Football Club
In the spring of 1895, Robson was appointed secretary to Southampton St Mary's Football Club, then playing in the Southern League. As secretary, he was responsible for signing new players and agreeing player contracts as well as being involved in team selection – the day to day coaching and training of the players was in the hands of the trainer.

One of Robson's first acts as secretary was to accompany Alfred McMinn, one of the club committee, on a trip to the Potteries to recruit players. McMinn was a native of Staffordshire and was "most persuasive on his home turf". On this trip, Robson and McMinn signed six players: Jack Farrell, Samuel Meston and Willie Naughton from Stoke, Watty Keay from Derby County, Joe Turner from Dresden United and Alf Wood from Burslem Port Vale, as well as recruiting Stoke's long-serving trainer, Bill Dawson. The Saints committee were anxious to secure their services and signed them before the Football League season was over. Port Vale and Stoke lodged a complaint with the Football Association (FA) about "poaching", and an emergency FA meeting was held at Sheffield, resulting in the Saints being severely censured for negligence. St Mary's were ordered to pay their own costs, plus £4 6s 3d to Stoke and £1 13s to Port Vale. McMinn was suspended for a year and Dawson for a month. Wood's registration with St Mary's was cancelled (shortly afterwards he moved to Stoke).

The 1895–96 season was the Saints' second in the Southern League, having finished third in the inaugural season. The team started the season badly, losing the first three matches, which was blamed on the inability of the new players to settle in the area. Eventually, under trainer Dawson's guidance, the team's form improved and there were only three further league defeats and they again finished third behind Millwall Athletic and Luton Town. Top scorer in the league was Jack Farrell with ten goals from his 17 appearances. The highlight of the league season was the visit of Millwall on 21 March 1896 when a crowd of 8,000 saw the Saints defeat the reigning champions 2–0, with goals from Charles Baker and Joe Turner.

The greatest excitement, however, came in the FA Cup, when an away victory over local rivals Freemantle in the first qualifying round was followed by comfortable home victories over Marlow (5–0), Reading (3–0) and Uxbridge (3–0). In the First Round proper, the Saints received a home draw against opposition from the Football League First Division for the second consecutive year, this time against The Wednesday. Saints' trainer, Bill Dawson, spent the week leading up to Wednesday's visit with extra training for the players, taking them through their paces on Shawford Down.

For the match, played at the Antelope Ground on 1 February 1896, the crowd was estimated at 12,000, by far the largest yet recorded for a football match in Southampton. The Saints had to play their third-choice goalkeeper, Walter Cox as Tom Cain was injured, and the Royal Artillery refused to allow on-loan 'keeper "Gunner" Reilly to play. The Saints took an early lead, through Watty Keay, before two goals from Alec Brady gave Wednesday the half-time lead. Wednesday increased their lead shortly after the break, and although Joe Turner got one back, the Saints were unable to score an equaliser. Wednesday ran out 3–2 winners and went on to win the Cup the following April.

At the end of the season, the Saints had to vacate the Antelope Ground, which had been sold for re-development, and moved to the County Ground, partly through the connections of the club's president, Robson's former Hampshire strike partner, Dr. H. W. R. Bencraft, who was also Hon. Secretary to the cricket club.

During the summer of 1896, Robson resigned his position as secretary (ready for Hampshire's first season back in the first-class cricket ranks), being replaced by Alfred McMinn (having served his twelve months' suspension), with Mr. E. Arnfield as his assistant.

Robson was one of the founder directors when the football club was incorporated into a limited company, "Southampton Football and Athletic Company Limited" in July 1897; on the Memorandum of Association he was listed as "Charles Robson, Mineral Water Merchant and Hampshire wicket-keeper" of Hill Lane, Southampton. He remained a director of the company for several years.

References

Bibliography

External links

Profile on www.cricinfo.com
Profile on www.cricketarchive.com
Biography

1859 births
1943 deaths
People from Kilburn, London
People educated at Chatham House Grammar School
English cricketers
Middlesex cricketers
Hampshire cricketers
Hampshire cricket captains
English football managers
People educated at Bruce Castle School
Southampton F.C. managers
Gentlemen of the South cricketers
North v South cricketers
Gentlemen cricketers
Marylebone Cricket Club cricketers
Gentlemen of England cricketers
London County cricketers
Southern Football League managers
Wicket-keepers